John Acheson Naylor (31 March 1934 – 15 September 1997) was a British actor whose screen career extended from 1970 to 1976. He appeared on television and in the 1970 feature film You Can't Win 'Em All. He is known for playing Major Beresford in the 1976 Doctor Who story "The Seeds of Doom".

Filmography

References

External links
 

British male film actors
British male television actors
1934 births
1997 deaths
20th-century British male actors